Sharpe's greenbul (Phyllastrephus alfredi) or the Malawi greenbul, is a species of songbird in the bulbul family, Pycnonotidae. It is found in Africa in south-western Tanzania, north-eastern Zambia and northern Malawi.

Taxonomy and systematics
Sharpe's greenbul was originally described in the genus Bleda. Alternatively, some authorities classify it as a subspecies of the yellow-streaked greenbul. Formerly, some authorities have considered Fischer's greenbul as a subspecies of Sharpe's greenbul.

References

Sharpe's greenbul
Birds of Sub-Saharan Africa
Birds of East Africa
Sharpe's greenbul